Elouera Street is a light rail station in Australia on the Canberra Metro R1 Civic to Gungahlin line, located at the intersection of Northbourne Avenue, Elouera Street and Gould Street. It is one of two stations serving the suburbs of Turner and Braddon. Bicycle racks are provided for commuters adjacent to the station. The station is close to Lonsdale Street, a popular dining and nightlife strip. Many businesses in this area were heavily impacted by road closures and delays during the construction phase, with a number of public car parks being lost to make way for light rail infrastructure contributing to prolonged accessibility issues.

Light rail services
All services in both directions stop at Ipima Street. Interchange with local ACTION bus routes is not possible at this station.

References

Light rail stations in Canberra
Railway stations in Australia opened in 2019